Gerald Glynn O'Collins  (born 1931) is an Australian Jesuit priest and academic. He was a research professor and writer-in-residence at the Jesuit Theological College (JTC) in Parkville, Victoria, and a research professor in theology at St Mary's University College in Twickenham. For more than three decades, he was professor of systematic and fundamental theology at the Pontifical Gregorian University (Rome).

In 2006, O'Collins was made a Companion of the General Division of the Order of Australia (AC), in recognition of his outstanding commitment to theological scholarship and ecumenical initiatives.

Life and career
O'Collins was born in Melbourne, Australia, in 1931 and educated at Xavier College. His maternal grandfather Paddy Glynn was a federal government minister, while his sister Maev O'Collins became a professor at the University of Papua New Guinea. O'Collins studied at the University of Melbourne, where he took both a first-class honours baccalaureate degree and a master's degree. He was ordained a Roman Catholic priest in 1963 and went on to earn a Licentiate in Sacred Theology (STL) at Heythrop College, Oxfordshire, in 1967. The next year he was made a Doctor of Theology by Cambridge University, where he held a research fellowship at Pembroke College. He taught at the Weston School of Theology (Boston Theological Institute) in Cambridge, Massachusetts, and the JTC in Melbourne for five years before accepting a professorship at the Gregorian University in Rome in 1973. He taught there until 2006. Additionally, he served as dean of the theological faculty for six years. After retiring from the Gregorian he was named research professor at St. Mary's University College.

O'Collins's has received several honorary doctorates: from the University of San Francisco (1991), University of Surrey (2003), Sacred Heart University (Bridgeport, Conn.) (2004); John Carroll University (Cleveland, Ohio) (2007); and a DD from Melbourne College of Divinity (2007); Honorary adjunct professor of Australian Catholic University (2007–2010).

O'Collins organised and co-chaired international ecumenical symposia on the Resurrection (1996), the Trinity (1998), the Incarnation (2000), the Redemption (2003), and the legacy of Pope John Paul II (2008), also co-editing their proceedings. He returned to Australia in 2009.

O'Collins has been an honorary visitor and a visiting scholar at Pembroke College, and he currently serves as an honorary adjunct professor at the Australian Catholic University. He has delivered the Fisher Lecture and the Margaret Beaufort Lecture at Cambridge and the Cardinal Hume Lectures at Heythrop College. Amongst other honours, he is the recipient of the Malipiero Prize, the Stefano Borgia European Prize, and the Johannes Quasten Medal given by Catholic University of America.

Selected works
 Christology: Origins, Developments Baylor University Press, 2015. ISBN 9781481302562. 

Light from Light: Scientists and Theologians in Dialogue (ed. with Mary Ann Meyers) Wm. B. Eerdmans, 2011. 
Rethinking Fundamental Theology OUP, 2011. 
Jesus Our Priest: A Christian Approach to the Priesthood of Christ (with Michael Keenan Jones) OUP, 2010. 
Catholicism. A Very Short Introduction OUP, 2008. 
The Legacy of John Paul II (ed. with Michael Hayes) Continuum, 2008. 
Jesus: A Portrait Darton, Longman & Todd, 2008. 
Salvation for All. God's Other Peoples OUP, 2008. 
Pope John Paul II. A Reader (with D Kendall and J LaBelle) Paulist Press, 2007. 
Christ Our Redeemer. A Christian Approach to Salvation OUP, 2007. 
The Lord's Prayer Darton, Longman & Todd, 2006.  (Paulist Press ed.)
Living Vatican II. The 21st Council for the 21st Century, Paulist Press, 2006 (awarded best theology book of 2006 by the Catholic Press Association of the United States and of Canada). 
Following the Way: Jesus Our Spiritual Director Paulist Press, 2000. 
Christology: A Biblical, Historical, and Systematic Study of Jesus OUP, 1995 – rev. 2nd ed. 2009. 
Jesus Risen: An Historical, Fundamental, and Systematic Examination of Christ's Resurrection Paulist Press, 1987.

See also
Catholic Church and ecumenism

Notes

External links
Official Profile, on the Australian Jesuits Website Accessed 25 October 2012
Biographical Note, on The Humble Approach Initiative
Bibliography on Good Reads
Gerald O'Collins – Curriculum of published works
Interview with Fr. O'Collins, on ViasTuas (Australia) dated 3 August 2004, at St Thomas More College, University of Western Australia

Living people
1931 births
Academics from Melbourne
Australian Jesuits
20th-century Jesuits
21st-century Jesuits
University of Melbourne alumni
20th-century Australian Roman Catholic priests
Alumni of Heythrop College
Alumni of the University of Cambridge
Academic staff of the Pontifical Gregorian University
Jesuit philosophers
20th-century Australian philosophers
21st-century Australian philosophers
Academics of St Mary's University, Twickenham
Australian Roman Catholic theologians
Philosophers of religion
People in Christian ecumenism
Christologists
Companions of the Order of Australia
21st-century Australian Roman Catholic priests